Oreste Magni (3 March 1936 – 16 March 1975) was an Italian racing cyclist. He won stage 4 of the 1961 Giro d'Italia.

References

External links
 

1936 births
1975 deaths
Italian male cyclists
Italian Giro d'Italia stage winners
Place of birth missing
Cyclists from the Province of Como